The Osun State gubernatorial election took place on 22 September 2018. The election was held alone where national and state level elections were to be held by 2019. Two-term incumbent Governor Rauf Aregbesola of the All Progressives Congress was in-eligible to run for re-election. Ademola Adeleke of the People's Democratic Party won the initial election as announced by INEC. but was defeated in a rerun on 27 September by Gboyega Oyetola.

Background
Rauf Aregbesola previously served as a commissioner in Lagos State under Bola Tinubu's administration prior to becoming governor.

Results 
The rerun on 27 September was called after the first round was declared inconclusive, on account of Ademola's margin of victory being smaller than the number of cancelled votes in seven polling units

Rerun Election

References

Osun State gubernatorial

Osun State gubernatorial elections
September 2018 events in Nigeria